Ivar Kants (born 19 July 1949) (commonly credited as Ivor Kants or Ivar Kanz) is an Australian actor of Latvian descent who has played numerous roles in soap operas including  A Country Practice, G.P., All Saints, Water Rats, and Blue Heelers.  He portrayed the role of Ken Garrett in the soap opera The Restless Years (1979) and starred as Father Menotti, a caring inner-city parish priest in the 1980–81 TV series Menotti.

A more prominent role was as school principal Barry Hyde, a regular in Home and Away. He has also appeared in Neighbours, Heartbreak High and in the TV movie The Plumber. He narrated the Hairy Maclary audiobook series released by ABC for Kids.

Early life 
Ivar Kants was born on July 19, 1949 in Adelaide, South Australia, Australia. Both his parents were originally from Latvia, but they immigrated to Australia before he was born. Ivar left home at 19 to enrol in National Institute of Dramatic Art (NIDA) in Sydney, and graduated with a degree in Performing Arts (Acting) in 1970.

Career 
In addition to his on-screen work, Ivar has also had an illustrious theatre career, with his many roles in Shakespeare plays colouring his vocal work. 

His ability to tell a story is supported by the many narrations he has recorded for SBS and the ABC. 

He narrated the Hairy Maclary audiobook series released by ABC for Kids.

Personal life 
Ivar has been married to Jenny Kants since 1970. They have four children, including his daughter Sarah Kants (born 1974), who is an actress.

Filmography

Films

Television

Accolades 
Kants was nominated for Best Actor at the 1984 AFI Awards for Silver City.

References

External links

1949 births
Living people
Australian male television actors
Australian people of Latvian descent
Male actors from Adelaide